This is a list of Kiteretsu episodes. The anime aired from March 27, 1988 to June 9, 1996 in Japan.

90 minute special

1988

References

Kiteretsu
Fujiko F Fujio